Gary A. Phillips (born December 7, 1939) is an American former professional basketball player.

A 6'3" (1.90 m) guard, Phillips starred at the University of Houston during the late 1950s and early 1960s.  He was the University of Houston's first All-America basketball player who earned Second-Team All-America honors in 1959–60 and First-Team honors in 1960–61. A two-time All-Missouri Valley Conference selection, Phillips ended his college career having scored 1,452 points.

He played five seasons (1961–1966) in the National Basketball Association as a member of the Boston Celtics and San Francisco Warriors.

External links
Career statistics

1939 births
Living people
All-American college men's basketball players
American men's basketball players
Basketball players from Illinois
Boston Celtics draft picks
Boston Celtics players
Houston Cougars men's basketball players
Point guards
San Francisco Warriors players
Shooting guards
Sportspeople from Quincy, Illinois